Snežeče is a settlement north of Dobrovo in the Municipality of Brda in the Littoral region of Slovenia.

The local church is dedicated to Our Lady of the Snows and belongs to the Parish of Biljana.

References

External links
Snežeče on Geopedia

Populated places in the Municipality of Brda